Emanuel Congregation (formerly Temple Emanuel) is a Chicago synagogue that was founded in 1880.  It is a Reform Jewish Synagogue located at 5959 N. Sheridan, Chicago, IL.

History

Fourteen German-speaking Jews founded Emanuel Congregation in 1880. The first president of Emanuel Congregation was Zacharias Sinzheimer. Originally founded on Orthodox ideology, Emanuel gradually shifted towards Reform Judaism by adopting Minhag America in 1889, choosing to worship with uncovered heads, and, finally, uniting with Congregation Or Chadosh in 1894.

Another notable change in the early years of the congregation is its formal shift from speaking German to English in 1901.

Between the years 1880 and 1923, the congregation had only six rabbis, with Rabbi Felix A. Levy serving for forty-seven years. During Rabbi Levy's time, the congregation grew considerably, with over three hundred members at one point during the time he served. While there were times of higher membership, such as during Rabbi Levy's time, there were also multiple times when Emanuel Congregation's membership dwindled, which was often due to the northward movement of the members. In order to continue to serve their members, the congregation moved locations, such as in 1896 when membership was declining and the congregation moved to a lot on Buckingham Place near Halsted Street, where they built a new building. In 1916, the building at this location was badly damaged by a fire. After this, the building was rebuilt and rededicated. The congregation grew once again, which led to another location change in 1949 to a lot on Sheridan Road at Thorndale Avenue. The newly built temple was dedicated in 1955 and is where Emanuel Congregation currently resides.

References 

German-American culture in Chicago
Reform synagogues in Illinois
Synagogues in Chicago
1880 establishments in Illinois
Religious organizations established in 1880
German-Jewish culture in the United States